The Department of Manufacturing Industry was an Australian government department that existed between June 1974 and December 1975.

History
When the Department of Manufacturing Industry was created in 1977, it was an amalgamation of the previous Department of Secondary Industry and the residual parts of the Department of Supply not incorporated in the amalgamated Department of Defence.

The department was abolished in 1975 and replaced with the Department of Administrative Services.

Scope
Information about the department's functions and/or government funding allocation could be found in the Administrative Arrangements Orders, the annual Portfolio Budget Statements and in the Department's annual reports.

At its creation, the Department was responsible for the following:
Secondary industry, including -  
the efficiency and development of industries 
Research 
Defence research and development, including support of space research programs of international organisations 
Supply, manufacture and procurement of goods and services, including munitions and aircraft for defence 
Disposal of surplus goods 
Government transport and storage facilities in the State and storage and transport of goods in the Australian Capital Territory

Structure
The Department was an Australian Public Service department, staffed by officials who were responsible to the Minister for Manufacturing Industry.

References

Ministries established in 1974
Manufacturing Industry
1974 establishments in Australia
1975 disestablishments in Australia